Valea Lungă (formerly Hususău;)  is a commune located in Alba County, Transylvania, Romania. Is composed of six villages: Făget (Oláhbükkös), Glogoveț (Kisgalgóc), Lodroman (Lodormány), Lunca (Küküllőlonka), Tăuni (Hosszúpatak) and Valea Lungă.

The commune is located in the northeastern side of the county, on the border with Sibiu County. Its 14th century Lutheran church is a historic monument.

History
Documentary of the existence of the village we have from the beginning of the fourteenth century. In 1309 reminded of the existence of an archdeacon of which was locality Valea Lungă, mentioning Arnold Longavalle priest of this town.

In the 14th, century the village is also mentioned several times in historical documents. In 1322 Karol Robert, King of Hungary, donated the village of Valea Lungă with village Micăsasa to Count Nicolaus in Tălmaciu and the villages Panada and Sona Valley Small Târnavei. These places belonged to Prince Ladislaus this year which have been taken to infidelity and data Nicolaus. Nicolaus died in 1340 without leaving descendants.

Tomas estate gives its ruler King except of Valea Lungă - this time called "Huziuazo" and Micăsasa village yet the king keeps in its field. Valea Lungă in 1359 is maintained in regal. In 1395 the town was in possession of several noble however. It recalls this year of a boundary between the villages and Balcaciu Jidvei and the Valea Lungă nobles here.

Natives
Vasile Aaron (1770—1822), lawyer and poet
Vasile Aftenie (1899–1950), auxiliary bishop of the Greek-Catholic Church, titular bishop of Ulpiana, and martyr of the faith 
Ioan Bianu (1856 or 1857–1935), philologist and bibliographer

References

Communes in Alba County
Localities in Transylvania